The women's competition in the light heavyweight (– 69 kg) division was held on 8–9 November 2011.

Schedule

Medalists

Records

 Liu Chunhong's world records were rescinded in 2017.

Results

References

(Pages 42, 44 & 46) Start List 
2011 IWF World Championships Results Book Pages 20–22 
Results

2011 World Weightlifting Championships
World